Purpurellus gambiensis, common name : the Gambia Murex, is a species of sea snail, a marine gastropod mollusk in the family Muricidae, the murex snails or rock snails.

Description
The size of an adult shell varies between 35 mm and 75 mm.

Distribution
This species is distributed in the Atlantic Ocean along Senegal, Guinea and Angola.

References

 Gofas, S.; Afonso, J.P.; Brandào, M. (Ed.). (S.a.). Conchas e Moluscos de Angola = Coquillages et Mollusques d'Angola. [Shells and molluscs of Angola]. Universidade Agostinho / Elf Aquitaine Angola: Angola. 140 pp
 Merle D., Garrigues B. & Pointier J.-P. (2011) Fossil and Recent Muricidae of the world. Part Muricinae. Hackenheim: Conchbooks. 648 pp. page(s): 142

External links
 

Muricinae
Gastropods described in 1845